Vigdís Grímsdóttir (born 15 August 1953) is an Icelandic writer.

Early life and education
Born on 15 August 1953 in Reykjavík, she qualified as a teacher in 1973, then gained her Bachelor of Arts at the University of Iceland in 1978, and a further degree in 1982. She has taught in primary and high schools in Hafnarfjörður and Reykjavik, but since 1990 has concentrated almost exclusively on her writing.

Career
She has written poetry, short stories, plays, and a children's book. One of her novels became the basis for a Swedish film. Her novel Kaldaljós was also the basis for two plays and an Icelandic film with the same title. Her books have been translated into many languages. Her 1989 novel Ég heiti Ísbjörg ég er ljón (My name is Ísbjörg, I am a Leo) was adapted for performance at the National Theatre of Iceland by Hávar Sigurjónsson in 1992.

Works in translation 
1990   "Vakna Törnrosa" í Sen dess har jag varit här hos er: 12 isländska noveller (Swedish)
1992   Nimeni on Ísbjörg, olen leijona (Finnish)
1993   Jeg hedder Ísbjörg, jeg er löve (Danish)
1995   Jag heter Ísbjörg, jag är ett lejon (Swedish)
1996   Je m'appele Ísbjörg, je suis lion (French)
1994   Flickan i skogen (Swedish)
1994   Metsän tyttö (Finnish)
1995   Pigen i skoven (Danish)
1995   Grandavägen 7 (Swedish)
1995   Kannastie 7 (Finnish)
1997   Älskades länder (Swedish)
1997   Z: rakkaustarina (Finnish)
1997   Z: A Love Story
1998   Z: en kärlekshistoria (Swedish)

References

External links
Icelandic literature site on her

1953 births
Vigdis Grimsdottir
Living people
Vigdis Grimsdottir
Vigdis Grimsdottir
Vigdís Grímsdóttir
Vigdís Grímsdóttir